Município da Estância Turística de Bananal is a city in the state of São Paulo in Brazil. It is part of the Metropolitan Region of Vale do Paraíba e Litoral Norte.

It borders three cities of Rio de Janeiro state (Barra Mansa to the north, Rio Claro to the east and Angra dos Reis to the south), as well as São José do Barreiro and Arapeí (both in São Paulo) to the west. It is the easternmost municipality in Sâo Paulo state.

It features a historical railway station imported from Belgium in 1888 and the Pharmácia Popular museum.

The municipality contains part of the  Mananciais do Rio Paraíba do Sul Environmental Protection Area, created in 1982 to protect the sources of the Paraíba do Sul river.
It also contains the  Bananal Ecological Station, created in 1987.

References 

Municipalities in São Paulo (state)
Populated places established in 1783